The common tody-flycatcher or black-fronted tody-flycatcher (Todirostrum cinereum) is a very small passerine bird in the tyrant flycatcher family. It breeds from southern Mexico to northwestern Peru, eastern Bolivia and southern, eastern and northeast Brazil.

Taxonomy
The common tody-flycatcher was formally described by the Swedish naturalist Carl Linnaeus in 1766 in the twelfth edition of his Systema Naturae under the binomial name Todus cinereus. Linnaeus based his description on the "Grey and Yellow Fly-catcher" that had been described and illustrated in 1760 by George Edwards from a specimen collected in Suriname. The specific epithet cinereum is from Latin cinereus meaning "ash-grey". The common tody-flycatcher is now the type species of the genus Todirostrum that was introduced by René Lesson in 1831.

Eight subspecies are recognised:
 Todirostrum cinereum virididorsale Parkes, 1976 – Veracruz and Oaxaca (south Mexico)
 Todirostrum cinereum finitimum Bangs, 1904 – Chiapas and Tabasco (south Mexico) to northwest Costa Rica
 Todirostrum cinereum wetmorei Parkes, 1976 – central Costa Rica and Panama
 Todirostrum cinereum sclateri (Cabanis & Heine, 1860) – southwest Colombia, west Ecuador and northwest Peru
 Todirostrum cinereum cinereum (Linnaeus, 1766) – Colombia, Venezuela, the Guianas and northeast Brazil
 Todirostrum cinereum. peruanum Zimmer, JT, 1930 – east Ecuador and east Peru
 Todirostrum cinereum coloreum Ridgway, 1906 – north Bolivia and north Paraguay to southeast Brazil and northeast Argentina
 Todirostrum cinereum cearae Cory, 1916 – east Brazil

Description
The upper head is black, shading to dark grey on the nape and dark olive-green on the rest of the upperparts. The usually cocked tail is black with white tips, and the wings are blackish with two yellow wing bars and yellow edging to the feathers. The underparts are entirely yellow. Sexes are similar, but young birds have a greyer upper head, buff wing markings, and paler underparts.

Males of this species have a rapid grasshopper-like ticking te’e’e’e’e’e’t call something like a tropical kingbird, and a dawn song consisting of a very fast high tic repeated up to 110 times a minute for minutes on end.

Distribution and habitat
It is a very common inhabitant in gardens, shady plantations, second growth and the edges and clearings of forest, although it avoids the dense interior of mature woodland and also arid areas. The common tody-flycatcher is usually seen in pairs, making rapid dashing sallies or hovering to pick small arthropods off the vegetation. It often wags its tail as it moves sideways along branches.

Behaviour and ecology

Breeding
The female incubates the two usually unspotted white eggs for the 15–16 days prior to hatching.

References

Further reading

Further reading

External links

 
 
 
 
 

common tody-flycatcher
Birds of Central America
Birds of Brazil
Birds of Bolivia
Birds of Ecuador
Birds of Colombia
Birds of Venezuela
Birds of Paraguay
Birds of the Guianas
Birds of the Peruvian Amazon
common tody-flycatcher
common tody-flycatcher